ThedaCare Regional Medical Center–Neenah, formerly Theda Clark Medical Center, is a hospital in the north central United States, located on the south end of Doty Island in Neenah, Wisconsin.  It is part of the ThedaCare health care system and a member of the Mayo Clinic Care Network.

The medical center is dedicated to Theda Clark Peters (1871–1903), daughter of Charles B. Clark , a philanthropist and one of the founders of Kimberly-Clark Corporation. A renowned community activist herself, she died at age 32 at her home while giving birth in 1903.

Recognizing the need for an area hospital, her family donated $96,000 to build a hospital in 1909 in her memory, and later donated another $50,000 to establish a fund to pay for care for those who couldn't afford it.

Replacement plan 
ThedaCare was in the process of seeking the closure of the hospital along with ThedaCare Regional Medical Center–Appleton. They would have then built a brand new mega-hospital to serve the Fox Cities. A representative of the company stated that investing in a new hospital would make more sense than investing in the remodeling of both hospitals. The representative also said that newer medical procedures, bring the need for different facilities. ThedaCare cited the need for a larger Intensive care unit to cope with the increased demand for beds in the unit as another reason to build another hospital.

On October 25, 2017, it was announced that the plan was abandoned and instead they would focus on remodeling the two hospitals.

History 
The hospital, called Theda Clark Hospital back then, was completed in October 1909. Over the years, the hospital had many major renovations and additions. The hospital gained an Intensive Care Unit, a NICU, a pain clinic, and a transport helicopter. In 2015, the name Theda Clark was changed to Theda Care.

In 2022, they sued former employees to prevent them from working for a competing hospital chain.

Theda Star

The hospital's heliport is home to Theda Care's Air Medical Helicopter service known as Theda Star. The service uses a single 2008 built Eurocopter EC135 painted in the Theda Star livery (N391PH) but other helicopters are substituted in when the main helicopter goes in for maintenance.

Theda Star is utilized to pick up trauma patients from accident scenes to the trauma center and to transfer patients between area hospitals.

2022 lawsuit against Ascension 

In December 2021, a radiological technician on the hospital's stroke care team applied for a similar job at St. Elizabeth Hospital across town. St. Elizabeth Hospital is owned and operated by Ascension. They accepted the position after being offered much higher pay and better terms of employment than at ThedaCare. Seven of the other ten ThedaCare team members then also applied for Ascension positions and were hired. The workers who left said that before they did, they asked ThedaCare if it could match the offers they had received, and the company declined.  All the employees were on an at-will employment status with ThedaCare and therefore had no contractual obligation to remain employed with the company.

Instead, a month later, ThedaCare filed for a temporary injunction in Outagamie County Court, seeking to prevent Ascension from fully employing those workers for 90 days, or until it could replace them. It argued that if they left when they did, it would be unable to provide the stroke care that had made it the only Level II stroke care unit in the Fox Valley and residents would be forced to go farther. On January 22, the injunction was granted, but the judge encouraged the hospitals to resolve their differences quickly.

On January 24, Thedacare lost its court battle to keep health care staff who wanted to work for Ascension.   Later that week Thedacare dropped their lawsuit against Ascension.

See also 
ThedaCare Regional Medical Center–Appleton

References

External links 

 
 Theda Clark Memorial Hospital From A History of Neenah
Theda Clark Hospital at If Neenah's Walls could Talk

Hospitals in Wisconsin
Buildings and structures in Winnebago County, Wisconsin
Hospitals established in 1909
Trauma centers